The 2022 Internationaux de Tennis de Blois was a professional tennis tournament played on clay courts. It was the eighth edition of the tournament which was part of the 2022 ATP Challenger Tour. It took place in Blois, France between 13 and 19 June 2022.

Singles main-draw entrants

Seeds

 1 Rankings are as of 6 June 2022.

Other entrants
The following players received wildcards into the singles main draw:
  Térence Atmane
  Arthur Fils
  Corentin Moutet

The following players received entry into the singles main draw as alternates:
  Gonzalo Lama
  Genaro Alberto Olivieri

The following players received entry from the qualifying draw:
  Gabriel Décamps
  Evgeny Karlovskiy
  Shintaro Mochizuki
  Alex Rybakov
  Nikolás Sánchez Izquierdo
  Luca Van Assche

Champions

Singles

  Alexandre Müller def.  Nikola Milojević 7–6(7–3), 6–1.

Doubles

  Sriram Balaji /  Jeevan Nedunchezhiyan def.  Romain Arneodo /  Jonathan Eysseric 6–4, 6–7(3–7), [10–7].

References

2022 ATP Challenger Tour
2022
2022 in French tennis
June 2022 sports events in France